The TCA Award for Outstanding Achievement in Youth Programming is an award given by the Television Critics Association.

Winners and nominees

See also
Daytime Emmy Award for Outstanding Children's Animated Program

References

External links
 Official website

Youth
Children's television awards
Awards established in 1985